Interference, Inc. was a guerrilla marketing company based in New York City. Founded in 2001 by Sam Travis Ewen, Interference gained notoriety through their unconventional tactics. Clients included General Electric, Citigroup, HBO and others. They were one of the first companies to utilize unconventional media such as underwater billboards, pop-up retail stores and event/stunt based media.

The company was responsible for the 2007 Boston Mooninite panic that occurred in Boston in January 2007. CEO Sam Travis Ewen addressed the event in the June issue of Inc. Magazine.

The company, along with The Supertouch Group (also run by Ewen), announced it would merge into advertising collective GUILD in May 2014.

Aqua Teen Hunger Force controversy in Boston 

On January 31, 2007, several guerrilla-marketing magnetic light displays in and around the city of Boston, Massachusetts were mistaken for possible explosive devices. Several subway stations, bridges, and a portion of Interstate 93 were closed as police examined, removed, and in some cases, destroyed the devices. The suspicious objects were revealed to be ads depicting the Mooninites, Ignignokt and Err, characters from Adult Swim's animated television series Aqua Teen Hunger Force.

External links
Official website
Brandweek Interview with Interference CEO Sam Ewen
AtNewYork interview with Sam Ewen
Entrepreneur Magazine - November 2001

References 

Advertising agencies of the United States
Companies based in New York City
2001 establishments in New York City
Companies established in 2001
2014 disestablishments in New York (state)
Companies disestablished in 2014